The 1983 Duke Blue Devils football team represented the Duke Blue Devils of Duke University during the 1983 NCAA Division I-A football season.

Schedule

Clemson was under NCAA probation, therefore this game did not count in the league standings.

References

Duke
Duke Blue Devils football seasons
Duke Blue Devils football